Jacques Delval (born 1 April 1908, date of death unknown) was a Belgian sports shooter. He competed in the 50 m rifle event at the 1948 Summer Olympics.

References

External links
 

1908 births
Year of death missing
Belgian male sport shooters
Olympic shooters of Belgium
Shooters at the 1948 Summer Olympics
People from Uccle
Sportspeople from Brussels